C. carvalhoi may refer to:

 Chiasmocleis carvalhoi, a frog species endemic to Brazil
 Colobosauroides carvalhoi, a lizard species in the genus Colobosauroides
 Cycloramphus carvalhoi, a frog species endemic to Brazil

See also
 Carvalhoi (disambiguation)